Paulo Szot is a Brazilian operatic baritone singer and actor. He made his opera debut in 1997 and his international career has included performances with the Metropolitan Opera, La Scala di Milano, Opera de Paris, Bayerische Staatsoper, Opera Australia, Liceo de Barcelona, among many others. In 2008, he made his Broadway debut as Emile De Becque in a revival of South Pacific, for which he won the Tony Award for Best Performance by a Leading Actor in a Musical, the Drama Desk Award, the Outer Critics Circle Award and the Theatre World Award. In 2012 he was nominated for a Laurence Olivier Award for best actor in a musical, and in 2014 was nominated for the MAC Award for best Celebrity Artist becoming the first Brazilian to receive such honors.

Biography
Szot was born in São Paulo to Polish parents who emigrated to Brazil after World War II. He began his musical training in piano at the age of five and later added violin and classical ballet. However, at age 21, a knee injury cut short any aspirations for a career in dance, causing him, with encouragement from his instructor, to pursue singing instead.

Szot studied at Jagiellonian University in Poland. He began singing professionally in 1990 with the National Song & Dance Ensemble "Śląsk". Later, he made his professional opera debut in a production of Il barbiere di Siviglia at the Municipal Theatre of São Paulo in 1997. Since then, he has performed with the New York City Opera, the Palm Beach Opera, the Canadian Opera Company, Opéra de Marseille, and Vlaamse Opera, among others, in such operas as L'elisir d'amore, La bohème, Don Giovanni, Cavalleria rusticana, Pagliacci, Carmen, Così fan tutte, Le nozze di Figaro and Maria Golovin. In March 2010 he made his debut at the Metropolitan Opera as Kovalyov in Dmitri Shostakovich's The Nose. Szot returned to the Metropolitan Opera as Escamillo sharing the stage with the French tenor Roberto Alagna and as Lescaut in Manon along with Anna Netrebko. Szot returned to the Met in 2014 as the Captain of the Achille Lauro in The Death of Klinghoffer. He sang the role of Guglielmo in Mozart's Così fan tutte at the Palais Garnier, and at the Aix-en-Provence Festival in Le nozze di Figaro. In 2013 he sang in The Nose at Teatro dell'Opera di Roma and at La Scala in the role of Filip Filippovich, the protagonist of Alexander Raskatov's 2009 opera A Dog's Heart. In 2018 and 2019, Szot sang the role of the Celebrant in the Chicago Symphony Orchestra's performance of Leonard Bernstein's Mass under the direction of Marin Alsop with the Chicago Children's Choir and the Highland Park High School Marching Band.

Of his performance in South Pacific, Ben Brantley of The New York Times wrote: "When he delivers 'Some Enchanted Evening' or 'This Nearly Was Mine,' it's not as a swoon-making blockbuster (though of course it is), but as a measured and honest consideration of love."

Stage productions

 Il Barbiere di Siviglia – 1996 – Teatro Paulo Eiró, São Paulo
 Gianni Scchicchi – 1997 – Sesc Ipiranga, São Paulo
 La Bohème – 1998 – Teatro Alfa Real, São Paulo
 Le Barbier de Séville – 1997 – Teatro Municipal de Santo André
 Carmen – 1998 – Teatro Municipal de São Paulo
 La Bohème – 1998 – Teatro Municipal de São Paulo
 L'elisir d'amore – 1998 – Festival Ópera de Manaus
 Don Giovanni – 1999 – Teatro Alfa Real, São Paulo
 Le Barbier de Séville – 1999 – Teatro São Pedro, São Paulo
 Don Giovanni – 1999 – Municipal de São Paulo
 Le Barbier de Séville – 1999 – Teatro São Pedro de Porto Alegre
 O Guarani – 1999 – Teatro Amazonas
 Carmen – 2000 – Teatro Municipal do Rio de Janeiro
 Cavaleria Rusticana – 2000 – Teatro Alfa Real, São Paulo
 I Pagliacci – 2000 – Teatro Alfa Real, São Paulo
 Die Fledermaus – 2000 – Teatro Rio de Janeiro
 Cavaleria Rusticana – 2000 – Teatro Municipal de São Paulo
 Pagliacci – 2000 – Teatro Municipal de São Paulo
 Tanhäuser – 2001 – Teatro Municipal do Rio de Janeiro
 Carmen – 2001 – Teatro Alfa, São Paulo
 Carmen – 2001 – Teatro Municipal de São Paulo
 Don Giovanni – 2001 – Teatro Amazonas
 La Bohème – 2001 – Teatro Amazonas
 Hansel et Gretel – 2001 – Teatro Municipal de São Paulo
 Manon – 2002 – Teatro Amazonas
 Manon – 2002 – Teatro Alfa – São Paulo
 Pagliacci – 2002 – Teatro Amazonas
 Il Barbiere di Siviglia - 2003 - Palacio das Artes
 Hansel et Gretel – 2003 – Teatro Municipal de São Paulo
 Cavaleria Rusticana – 2003 – Teatro Amazonas
 Don Pasquale – 2003 – Teatro São Pedro, São Paulo
 Don Pasquale – 2003 – Teatro Municipal de Santo André
 Lustige Witwe – 2003 – Porto Alegre
 Carmen – 2003 – New York City Opera
 Don Giovanni – 2003 – Michigan Opera
 Le Nozze di Figaro – 2004 – New York City Opera
 Carmen – 2004 – Palm Beach Opera
 Eugène Onegin – 2004 – Ópera de Marseille
 Orfeo – 2004 – Teatro Sérgio Cardoso
 L'elisir d'amore – 2005 – New York City Opera
 Rita – 2005 – Festival de Campos do Jordão
 Dido et Aeneas – 2005 – Opera de Marseille
 Don Giovanni – 2005 – Opera de Toulon
 Don Giovanni – 2005 – Opera de Bordeaux
 Così fan tutte – 2006 – Opera de Marseille
 Maria Golovin – 2006 – Opera de Marseille
 Don Giovanni – 2006 – Opera de Bogota - Colombia
 Così fan tutte – 2007 – Opera de Nice
 Le nozze di Figaro – 2007 – Boston
 Maria Golovin – Spoleto Opera Festival, 2007 - Italy
 Le Portrait de Manon – 2007 – Liceo de Barcelona
 Le Nozze di Figaro – 2007 – Vlaamse Opera, Anvers
 Le Nozze di Figaro – 2008 – Vlaamse Opera, Gand
 South Pacific – 2008 – Lincoln Center Theater, New York
 La Veuve Joyeuse – 2008 – Opera de Marseille
 South Pacific – 2009 – Lincoln Center Theater, New York
 The Nose – 2010 – Metropolitan Opera New York
 South Pacific – 2010 – Lincoln Center Theater, New York
 Carmen – 2011 – Metropolitan Opera New York
 Così fan tutte – 2011 – Opera Garnier, Paris
 South Pacific – 2011 – Barbican, London
 Carmen – 2011 – San Francisco Opera
 South Pacific – 2011 – Oxford
 Manon – 2012 – Metropolitan Opera House New York
 Le Nozze di Figaro – 2012 – Festival d'Aix-en-Provence 
 Don Giovanni – 2012 – Washington Opera
 The Nose - Il Naso – 2013 – Opera di Roma
 A Dog's Heart - Cuore di Cane  – 2013 – La Scala
 The Nose – 2013 – Metropolitan Opera
 Die Fledermaus - 2013/2014 – Metropolitan Opera
 Eugène Onegin - 2014 - Melbourne Opera House 
 Candide — 2014 — Sala São Paulo - OSESP
 The Death of Klinghoffer – 2014 – Metropolitan Opera
 Le Nozze di Figaro – 2014 - Théâtre National de Bahreïn / Aix-en-Provence
 Manon Lescaut - Teatro Municipal de Sao Paulo - Lescaut - 2015
 Die Fledermaus - The Metropolitan Opera - 2015/2016 - Falke
 Madama Butterfly - Opera de Marseille - 2016 - Sharpless
 Romeo et Juliette - Palacio das Artes - 2016 - Mercutio
 My Fair Lady - Teatro Santander - 2016 - Henry Higgins
 Così fan tutte - "Don Alfonso" -  2017 - Palais Garnier Opéra National de Paris
 The New Prince - 2017 - Dutch Opera - Hamilton/Clinton/Nixon - Amsterdam - Nederlands
 Carmen - Bayerische Staatsoper - Munich - Escamillo - 2017 - Germany
 Evita - Shakespeare Festival - Pennsylvania - Juan Peron - 2017 -  USA
 Street Scene - Teatro Real - Madri - 2018 - Frank Maurant
 La Traviata - Palacio das Artes - BH - 2018 - Giorgio Germont
 La Traviata - Teatro Municipal de Sao Paulo - 2018 - G. Germont
 Mass - Leonard Bernstein - South Bank Centre - 2018 - Celebrant - London
 Mass - Leonard Bernstein - Ravinia Festival - 2018 - Celebrant - USA
 Evita - A. L. Webber - Opera Australia - Sydney and Melbourne - 2018/2019 - Juan Peron
 Merry Widow - Franz Lehar  - Opera di Roma - 2019 - Danilo
 Mass - Leonard Bernstein - Ravinia Festival - 2019 - Celebrant - USA
 Madama Butterfly - Puccini - Metropolitan Opera - New York - 2019 - Sharpless
 Chicago on Broadway - Ambassador Theater - New York - 2020 and 2021 - Billy Flynn  
 Street Scene - Opera de Monte Carlo - 2020 - Frank
 Chicago - Teatro Santander - São Paulo - 2022 - Billy Flynn
 & Juliet - Princess of Wales Theatre - Toronto - 2022 - Lance

Awards

References

External links

 
TheaterMania.com interview with Szot
"Brief Encounter With Paulo Szot", Playbill article
Szot singing "Some Enchanted Evening" for the South Pacific cast recording, Masterworks Broadway video
Stephen Holden's New York Times review of Paulo Szot's performance at the Cafe Carlyle.
Interview with Szot in English and Portuguese

1969 births
Living people
Male actors from São Paulo
20th-century Brazilian male opera singers
Drama Desk Award winners
Brazilian male musical theatre actors
Operatic baritones
Tony Award winners
Jagiellonian University alumni
Brazilian people of Polish descent
21st-century Brazilian male actors
20th-century Brazilian male actors
21st-century Brazilian male opera singers
Brazilian baritones
Singers from São Paulo
Theatre World Award winners